Mark Kaufmann is a Canadian retired ice hockey center who was an All-American for Yale.

Career
Kaufmann was born in Japan and was there until age 6 when his family moved back to British Columbia. After working his way through the junior programs, Kaufmann began attending Yale University in the fall of 1989. In his first two seasons with the team, Kaufmann played well but the Bulldogs weren't very good, finishing both years with losing records. Yale and Kaufmann began to see a change in 1991 when his point production nearly doubled and the team posted its first winning season in 5 years. The Bulldogs held firm in Kaufmann's final season but he increased his scoring to more than two points per game and was named an All-American. Kaufmann also set a program record for the most points in a season that stands as of 2021.

After graduating, Kaufmann began his professional career with Asiago but then joined Team Canada for parts of three years. At the tail end of the 1996 season, he signed on with the Portland Pirates and helped the team reach the Calder Cup finals that year. Despite producing in postseason, Kaufmann returned to Europe after the season and played for three teams over the course of the next three years.

In 1999 the Nikkō Ice Bucks were reestablished after a financial crisis and Kaufmann got a chance to return to his first home. He played parts of four years with the club, leading the Bucks in scoring three times, and retired in 2003.

While he had been pursuing his hockey career, Kaufmann had been working part-time as a software designer. As his playing career was coming to a close, he transitioned into linguistic training and worked with the Linguistic Institute until co-founding his own company along with his father Steve Kaufmann, LingQ in 2007. He continued to work as the CEO of LingQ while also serving as President of KP Logix, a software company located in the Vancouver area.

Statistics

Regular season and playoffs

Awards and honors

References

External links

1971 births
Living people
Sportspeople from Tokyo
Canadian ice hockey centres
Yale Bulldogs men's ice hockey players
AHCA Division I men's ice hockey All-Americans
Asiago Hockey 1935 players
Portland Pirates players
EC KAC players
SC Rapperswil-Jona Lakers players
Nikkō Ice Bucks players